is a railway station in the village of Sakegawa, Yamagata, Japan, operated by East Japan Railway Company (JR East).

Lines
Uzen-Toyosato Station is served by the Ōu Main Line, and is located 161.3 rail kilometers from the terminus of the line at Fukushima Station.

Station layout
The station has one side platform serving a single bidirectional track. The station is unattended.

History
Uzen-Toyosato Station opened on December 15, 1921. The station was absorbed into the JR East network upon the privatization of JNR on April 1, 1987. A new station building was completed in April 2009.

Surrounding area
Sakegawa River

See also
List of railway stations in Japan

References

External links

 JR East Station information 

Stations of East Japan Railway Company
Railway stations in Yamagata Prefecture
Ōu Main Line
Railway stations in Japan opened in 1921
Sakegawa, Yamagata